Blind Sports Australia (BSA; 2010+), formerly the Australian Blind Sports Federation (ABSF) was formed in 1980 as the national body to coordinate sport for the blind and vision-impaired in Australia. It encourages and provides access to international competition in world blind and multi-disabled championships for sports recognised by the International Blind Sports Federation (IBSA) and the International Paralympic Committee (IPC).  BSA is headquartered near Melbourne.

Blind and vision impaired athletes and teams participate in national championships in athletics, cricket, equestrian, goalball, golf, judo, karate, lawn bowls, powerlifting, rowing, sailing, swimming, tandem cycling, tenpin bowling, water skiing, wrestling, and winter sports.

Members

Member organisations  

Australian Blind Bowlers Association (ABBA) since 1980
Australian Blind Cricket Council (ABCC) since 1951
Blind Golf Australia (BGA) since 1992
Goalball Australia (GA) since 1980

Member associations
The following organisations conduct national championships on behalf of the BSA:

 VISACT
 Blind Sporting Association of New South Wales
 Blind Sport and Recreation Victoria
 Sporting Wheelies and Disabled Association of Queensland
 Association of South Australian Blind Sporting Clubs
 Association for the Blind of WA

Altogether there are 2,600 vision-impaired athletes in whose interests BSA acts at the national and international level for competition, coaching, sport psychology and program development.

BSA athletes are current world champions or world record holders in field athletics, tandem cycling, tenpin bowling, powerlifting, swimming, water skiing and alpine skiing.

See also 

 Australia at the Paralympics 
 Disabled sports
 Australia men's national goalball team
 Australia women's national goalball team

References

Bibliography

External links
 

Parasports organisations in Australia
Blindness organisations in Australia
1980 establishments in Australia
Sports organizations established in 1980